Lanceacheyla whartoni is a species of mite in a monotypic genus in the family Cheyletidae.

References

Trombidiformes
Monotypic arthropod genera
Acari genera